Sacred Heart Church (also known as Herz Jesu Kirche), of Divine Mercy Parish, which is part of the Roman Catholic Diocese of Covington, is a historic church at 341 Taylor Avenue in Bellevue, Kentucky. It is part of the Roman Catholic Diocese of Covington.

It was built in 1892 and added to the National Register of Historic Places in 1974.

The official website for this church is: dmsbcatholic.com

See also
National Register of Historic Places listings in Campbell County, Kentucky

References

Roman Catholic churches in Kentucky
Churches on the National Register of Historic Places in Kentucky
Gothic Revival church buildings in Kentucky
Roman Catholic churches completed in 1892
19th-century Roman Catholic church buildings in the United States
Churches in Campbell County, Kentucky
National Register of Historic Places in Campbell County, Kentucky
1892 establishments in Kentucky
Roman Catholic Diocese of Covington